Every Singaporean Son – Epilogue is a Singaporean documentary released in 2011. This is the aftermath from the first season of Every Singaporean Son. 6 episodes will be released, down 12 episodes from the previous season. The first episode airs on 17 August 2011 on YouTube, each clip lasted for 6 to 8 minutes.

The series branched out to its second season of Every Singaporean Son, premiering every Thursday of the week, starting from 16 August 2012, it will be named: Every Singaporean Son II - The Making of an Officer. The series will concentrate on batch of cadets training to be officers in OCS Officer Cadet School, it will last for 20 to 25 episodes.

Plot
It has been past a year since our 15 recruits endured the compulsory 9 weeks of Basic Military Training. In this season, only 6 will showcase how are they coping after their BMT and the unit life that they each is facing. The documentary is split into 6 episodes allowing all pre-enlistees and parents understand the life after BMT.

Cast
Episode 1: 3SG Muhd Nabil – Instructor, Basic Military Training Centre
Episode 2: 2SG Lemuel Teo – Platoon Sergeant, 6th Battalion, Singapore Infantry Regiment (6 SIR)
Episode 3: CPL Daryl Lim – Aviation Vehicle Specialist, Airfield Maintenance Squadron, Tengah Air Base
Episode 4: 2LT Douglas Wong – Military Transport Officer, Transport Hub West
Episode 5: CPL Muhd Syabil – Security Trooper, 8th Battalion, Singapore Infantry Regiment (8 SIR)
Episode 6: CPL Dom Ang (Shaoquan) – Sea Soldier, Tuas Defence Squadron

Episodes

References

External links
Official website

Singaporean television series
2011 Singaporean television seasons